Roko Jureškin (born 29 September 2000) is a Croatian footballer who plays as a left-back for Italian  club Benevento on loan from Pisa.

Club career

Sereď
Jureškin made his Fortuna Liga debut for iClinic Sereď against Spartak Trnava during an away fixture on 21 July 2019. Jureškin was fielded during the half time as a replacement for Aldo Baéz. He was also booked late in the second half with a yellow card.

In his fourth start, during a match against Nitra at pod Zoborom, Jureškin recorded his first goal for iClinic. After over an hour of play, Jureškin had replaced Cléber, as Nitra was in a 2:0 lead. While on the pitch, Jureškin had witnessed a goal per side - first Nitra had increased the lead through Milan Ristovski and then Dino Špehar had narrowed the gap. In the 78th minute, after a pass by Alex Iván, Jureškin had brought Sereď to a one goal difference, but the red-whites had failed to equalise and lost the game 2:3.

Despite five consecutive appearances at the start of the season Jureškin had lost his place in the squad in late August, making a single league appearance since (against AS Trenčín on 28 September 2019) and missing 13 other games.

Loan at Žilina
During the winter of 2020, Jureškin had left for MŠK Žilina B, competing in 2. Liga. He had made an impression during a friendly against Sigma Olomouc, scoring both goals of the match.

He made his league debut for Žilina in the first spring fixture against Petržalka. He appeared as a second half tactical replacement for Vahan Bichakhchyan, as Žilina held a 1:0 lead. Žilina went on to hold onto the three points. In the following week, however, the season was postponed due to the COVID-19 pandemic.

Pisa
On 10 July 2022, Jureškin signed a three-year contract with Pisa in Italian second-tier Serie B. On 31 January 2023, he moved on loan to Benevento in the same league, with an option to buy.

References

External links
 
 Footballdatabase Profile

2000 births
Living people
Footballers from Split, Croatia
Croatian footballers
Association football midfielders
ŠKF Sereď players
MŠK Žilina players
Pisa S.C. players
Benevento Calcio players
Slovak Super Liga players
2. Liga (Slovakia) players
Serie B players
Croatian expatriate footballers
Expatriate footballers in Slovakia
Croatian expatriate sportspeople in Slovakia
Expatriate footballers in Italy
Croatian expatriate sportspeople in Italy